Tyler Olson may refer to:

 Tyler Olson (politician) (born 1976), American politician from Iowa
 Tyler Olson (baseball) (born 1989), American baseball player